Armia is a Polish punk rock band.

Armia may also refer to:

 Joel Armia (born 1993), Finnish ice hockey player
 BC Armia, professional basketball club based in Tbilisi

See also
 Arnia, Indian town